William Gedney was a photographer.

William Gedney may also refer to:

William J. Gedney
William Gedney (MP) for Wells (UK Parliament constituency)